Guadalcázar may refer to:
 Guadalcázar, San Luis Potosí, México
 Guadalcázar (Córdoba), Spain
 Villa de Santa Catalina de Guadalcázar del Valle de Moquegua, Peru
 Santiago de Guadalcázar, Argentina
 Diego Fernández de Córdoba, Marquis of Guadalcázar